The 2020 Belgian Indoor Athletics Championships was the year's national championship in indoor track and field for Belgium. It was held on Sunday 16 February at the Flanders Sports Arena in Ghent. A total of 25 events, 13 for men and 12 for women, were contested. It was to serve as preparation for the 2020 World Athletics Indoor Championships, which was postponed due to the COVID-19 outbreak in China before the national championships.

Results

Men

Women

References

Results
 Results   

Belgian Indoor Athletics Championships
Belgian Indoor Athletics Championships
Belgian Indoor Athletics Championships
Belgian Indoor Athletics Championships
Sports competitions in Ghent